The Russian Federation is known to possess or have possessed three types of weapons of mass destruction: nuclear weapons, biological weapons, and chemical weapons. It is one of the five nuclear-weapon states recognized under the Treaty on the Non-Proliferation of Nuclear Weapons.

Russia possesses a total of 5,977 nuclear warheads as of 2022, the largest stockpile of nuclear warheads in the world; the second-largest stockpile is the United States' 5,428 warheads. Russia's deployed missiles (those actually ready to be launched) number about 1,588, second to the United States' 1,644. The remaining weapons are either in reserve stockpiles, or have been retired and are slated for dismantling. Russia's predecessor state, the Soviet Union, reached a peak stockpile of about 45,000 nuclear warheads in 1986. The number of weapons Russia may possess is currently controlled by the bilateral New START treaty with the United States.

The Soviet Union ratified the Geneva Protocol—prohibiting the use of biological and chemical weapons—on April 5, 1928, with reservations that were later dropped on January 18, 2001. Russia is also party to the 1972 Biological Weapons Convention and the 1993 Chemical Weapons Convention. The Soviet biological weapons program violated the Biological Weapons Convention and was the world's largest, longest, and most sophisticated program of its kind. At its peak, the program employed up to 65,000 people.

Despite being a signatory to the Chemical Weapons Convention, Russia has continued to hold chemical weapons. In 1997, Russia declared an arsenal of 39,967 tons of chemical weapons, which it worked in part to decrease. Its stock of weapons was declared destroyed in 2017. The poisoning of Sergei and Yulia Skripal in 2018 and the poisoning of Alexei Navalny in 2020, both carried out by Russia, revealed that the country maintained an illicit chemical weapons program.

Nuclear weapons

History

Soviet era

Post-Soviet era
At the dissolution of the Soviet Union in 1991, Soviet nuclear weapons were deployed in four of the new republics: Russia, Ukraine, Belarus and Kazakhstan. In May 1992, these four states signed the Lisbon Protocol, agreeing to join the Treaty on the Non-Proliferation of Nuclear Weapons, with Russia the successor state to the Soviet Union as a nuclear state, and the other three states joining as non-nuclear states.

Ukraine agreed to give up its weapons to Russia, in exchange for guarantees of Ukrainian territory from Russia, the United Kingdom, and the United States, known as the Budapest Memorandum on Security Assurances. China and France also made statements in support of the memorandum.

Arms reduction 

The threat of nuclear warfare was a persistent and terrifying threat during the Cold War. At its height, the Soviet Union and United States each mustered tens of thousands of warheads, under the doctrine of mutual assured destruction. By the 1980s, both the United States and Soviet Union sought to reduce the number of weapons the other was fielding. This led to the opening of arms reduction talks in 1982.

This culminated in the signing of the START I treaty in 1991: the first nuclear arms reduction treaty between the two global powers. This first treaty limited the number of deployed warheads in each nation to 6,000, nearly halving the prior 10,000 to 12,000 being fielded in 1991. The considerable success of START I, combined with the dissolution of the Soviet Union in 1991, led to the START II treaty. Russia never ratified the treaty, and it did not go into effect. An attempted START III was attempted but could not get past negotiations.

Instead, the Strategic Offensive Reductions Treaty was passed in 2002, capping warheads at 2,200. The current limitations stem from the New START treaty, ratified in 2010. It limits each side to 1,550 weapons. Nuclear bombers only count as one weapon each, even though they may carry up to 20, so the actual limit on the countries is slightly higher. The treaty is in force through to 2026.

After U.S. President George W. Bush withdrew from the 1972 Anti-Ballistic Missile Treaty, Russia responded by building-up their nuclear capabilities, in such a way as to counterbalance U.S. capabilities. Russia decided not to sign the UN treaty on the Prohibition of Nuclear Weapons, which was adopted on 7 July 2017 by 122 States. Most analysts agree that Russia's nuclear strategy under Putin eventually brought it into violation of the 1987 Intermediate-Range Nuclear Forces Treaty (although this is not confirmed).

According to Russian officials, the American decision to deploy the missile defense system in Europe was a violation of the treaty. U.S. President Donald Trump announced on 20 October 2018 that the U.S. would no longer consider itself bound by the treaty's provisions, raising nuclear tensions between the two powers.

Nuclear arsenal of Russia
The exact number of nuclear warheads is a state secret and is therefore a matter of guesswork. As of 2022, the Federation of American Scientists estimates that Russia possesses 5,977 nuclear weapons, while the United States has 5,428; Russia and the U.S. each have about 1,600 active deployed strategic nuclear warheads. Russia's stockpile is growing in size, while the United States' is shrinking. Russia has six nuclear missile fields in Kozelsk, Tatishchevo, Uzhur, Dombarovskiy, Kartalay, and Aleysk; nuclear missile submarines patrolling from three naval bases at Nerpich'ya, Yagel'Naya, and Rybachiy; and nuclear bombers at Ukrainka and Engels air bases.

The RS-28 Sarmat (Russian: РС-28 Сармат; NATO reporting name: SATAN 2), is a Russian liquid-fueled, MIRV-equipped, super-heavy thermonuclear armed intercontinental ballistic missile in development by the Makeyev Rocket Design Bureau since 2009, intended to replace the previous R-36 missile. Its large payload would allow for up to 10 heavy warheads or 15 lighter ones, or a combination of warheads and massive amounts of countermeasures designed to defeat anti-missile systems. It was heralded by the Russian military as a response to the U.S. Prompt Global Strike.

In 2015, information emerged that Russia may be developing a new nuclear torpedo, the Status-6 Ocean Multipurpose System, codenamed "Kanyon" by Pentagon officials. This weapon is designed to create a tsunami wave up to 500m tall that will radioactively contaminate a wide area on an enemy coasts with cobalt-60, and to be immune to anti-missile defense systems such as laser weapons and railguns that might disable an ICBM. Two potential carrier submarines, the Project 09852 Belgorod, and the Project 09851 Khabarovsk, are new boats laid down in 2012 and 2014 respectively.

Status 6 appears to be a deterrent weapon of last resort. This underwater drone is cloaked by stealth technology to elude acoustic tracking devices.

During an annual state-of-the-nation address given on March 1, 2018, President Vladimir Putin publicly claimed that Russia was now in possession of several new classes of nuclear weapons, including some with capabilities previously speculated to exist. Putin discussed several new or upgraded weapons, including a hypersonic glide vehicle known as the Avangard, capable of performing sharp maneuvers while traveling at 20 times the speed of sound making it "absolutely invulnerable for any missile defense system."

Putin discussed the existence of a nuclear powered underwater torpedo and a nuclear powered cruise missile (9M730 Burevestnik), both with effectively unlimited range. He discussed that Russia had tested a new class of traditional ICBM called the Sarmat, which expanded upon the range and carrying capability of the Soviet-era Satan ICBM. Animations of these weapons were shown in front of the live and televised audience. Putin suggested that an online poll be conducted to give them official public names.

Nuclear weapons in Russian military doctrine

According to a Russian military doctrine stated in 2010, nuclear weapons could be used by Russia "in response to the use of nuclear and other types of weapons of mass destruction against it or its allies, and also in case of aggression against Russia with the use of conventional weapons when the very existence of the state is threatened". Most military analysts believe that, in this case, Russia would pursue an 'escalate to de-escalate' strategy, initiating limited nuclear exchange to bring adversaries to the negotiating table. Russia will also threaten nuclear conflict to discourage initial escalation of any major conventional conflict.

Nuclear proliferation

After the Korean War, the Soviet Union transferred nuclear technology and weapons to the People's Republic of China as an adversary of the United States and NATO. According to Ion Mihai Pacepa, "Khrushchev's nuclear-proliferation process started with Communist China in April 1955, when the new ruler in the Kremlin consented to supply Beijing a sample atomic bomb and to help with its mass production. Subsequently, the Soviet Union built all the essentials of China's new military nuclear industry."

Russia is one of the five "Nuclear Weapons States" (NWS) under the Treaty on the Non-Proliferation of Nuclear Weapons (NPT), which Russia ratified (as the Soviet Union) in 1968.

Following the dissolution of the Soviet Union in 1991, a number of Soviet-era nuclear warheads remained on the territories of Belarus, Ukraine, and Kazakhstan. Under the terms of the Lisbon Protocol to the NPT, and following the 1995 Trilateral Agreement between Russia, Belarus, and the US, these were transferred to Russia, leaving Russia as the sole inheritor of the Soviet nuclear arsenal. It is estimated that the Soviet Union had approximately 45,000 nuclear weapons stockpiled at the time of its collapse.

The collapse of the Soviet Union allowed for a warming of relations with NATO. Fears of a nuclear holocaust lessened. In September 1997, the former secretary of the Russian Security Council Alexander Lebed claimed 100 "suitcase sized" nuclear weapons were unaccounted for. He said he was attempting to inventory the weapons when he was fired by President Boris Yeltsin in October 1996. Indeed, several US politicians have expressed worries and promised legislation addressing the threat.

There were allegations that Russia contributed to the North Korean nuclear program, selling it the equipment for the safe storage and transportation of nuclear materials. Nevertheless, Russia has condemned North Korean nuclear tests since then. The Russian Federation has also wider commercial interests in selling the nuclear technology to India and Iran, reaching understanding memorandums in training their technicians in their respected nuclear programs. Russia is allegedly making efforts to build its influential hold in Africa for earning several billions of pounds by selling nuclear technology to developing African countries.

Nuclear sabotage allegations from Russia
The highest-ranking GRU defector Stanislav Lunev described alleged Soviet plans for using tactical nuclear weapons for sabotage against the United States in the event of war. He described Soviet-made suitcase nukes identified as RA-115s (or RA-115-01s for submersible weapons) which weigh . These portable bombs can last for many years if wired to an electric source. "In case there is a loss of power, there is a battery backup. If the battery runs low, the weapon has a transmitter that sends a coded message – either by satellite or directly to a GRU post at a Russian embassy or consulate."

Lunev was personally looking for hiding places for weapons caches in the Shenandoah Valley area. He said that "it is surprisingly easy to smuggle nuclear weapons into the US" either across the Mexican border or using a small transport missile that can slip though undetected when launched from a Russian airplane. Searches of the areas identified by Lunev – who admits he never planted any weapons in the US – have been conducted, "but law-enforcement officials have never found such weapons caches, with or without portable nuclear weapons" in the US.

In a 2004 interview, colonel general of RVSN Viktor Yesin said that Soviet small-scale nuclear bombs have only been operated by the Army. All such devices have been stored in a weapons depot within Russia, and only left it for checks at the plant which produced them.

2020 Russian nuclear deterrence state policy 

On June 2, 2020, President Putin signed an Executive Order formally titled "Fundamentals of Russia’s Nuclear Deterrence State Policy", in an unprecedented public release of an official document on Russia's nuclear policy. The six-page document identified the range of threats that Russia seeks to deter with its nuclear forces, clarified Russia’s general approach to nuclear deterrence, and articulated conditions under which Russia might use of nuclear weapons. The policy endorses the use of nuclear weapons in response to a non-nuclear strike due to the improved capabilities of U.S. conventional weapons.

2022 Russian invasion of Ukraine

During the 2022 Russian invasion of Ukraine, Russian President Vladimir Putin placed Strategic Rocket Forces's nuclear deterrence units on high alert, a move heavily condemned internationally. Putin warned that "whoever tries to hinder us in Ukraine would see consequences, you have never seen in your history". According to the US Director of National Intelligence, Avril Haines, Putin could potentially turn to nuclear weapons if he perceived an "existential threat" to the Russian state or regime. He could regard a possible defeat in Ukraine as an existential threat to his regime.

According to a peer-reviewed study published in the journal Nature Food in August 2022, a full-scale nuclear war between the United States and Russia, which together hold more than 90% of the world's nuclear weapons, would kill 360 million people directly and more than 5 billion indirectly by starvation during a nuclear winter.

In September 2022, Putin announced the 2022 Russian mobilization and threatened nuclear retaliation against the west if Russia's territorial integrity was threatened.

On February 21, 2023, Putin suspended Russia's participation in the New START nuclear arms reduction treaty with the United States, saying that Russia would not allow the US and NATO to inspect its nuclear facilities.

Biological weapons

The Soviet Union covertly operated the world's largest, longest, and most sophisticated biological weapons program. The program began in the 1920s and lasted until at least September 1992 but has possibly been continued by Russia after that. Thereby, the Soviet Union violated its obligations under the Biological Weapons Convention, which it had signed on April 10, 1972, and ratified on March 26, 1975.

In the early 1970s, the Soviet Union significantly enlarged its offensive biological weapons programs. After 1975, the program of biological weapons was run primarily by the "civilian" Biopreparat agency, although it also included numerous facilities run by the Soviet Ministry of Defense, Ministry of Agriculture, Ministry of Chemical Industry, Ministry of Health, and Soviet Academy of Sciences.

According to Ken Alibek, who was deputy-director of Biopreparat, the Soviet biological weapons agency, and who defected to the United States in 1992, weapons were developed in labs in isolated areas of the Soviet Union including mobilization facilities at Omutininsk, Penza and Pokrov and research facilities at Moscow, Stirzhi and Vladimir. These weapons were tested at several facilities most often at "Rebirth Island" (Vozrozhdeniya) in the Aral Sea by firing the weapons into the air above monkeys tied to posts, the monkeys would then be monitored to determine the effects. According to Alibek, although Soviet offensive program was officially ended in 1992, Russia may be still involved in the activities prohibited by BWC.

In 1993, the story about the Sverdlovsk anthrax leak was published in Russia. The ensuing outbreak of the disease resulted in 94 people becoming infected, 64 of whom died over a period of six weeks.

As of 2021, the United States Department of State "assesses that the Russian Federation (Russia) maintains an offensive [biological weapons] program and is in violation of its obligation under Articles I and II of the BWC. The issue of compliance by Russia with the BWC has been of concern for many years".

Chemical weapons
Russia signed the Chemical Weapons Convention on January 13, 1993, and ratified it on November 5, 1997. Russia declared an arsenal of 39,967 tons of chemical weapons in 1997 consisting of:
blister agents: Lewisite, mustard, Lewisite-mustard-mix (HL)
nerve agents: Sarin, Soman, VX

Ratification was followed by three years of inaction on chemical weapons destruction because of the August 1998 Russian financial crisis.

Russia met its treaty obligations by destroying 1% of its chemical agents by the Chemical Weapons Convention's 2002 deadline, but requested technical and financial assistance and extensions on the deadlines of 2004 and 2007 due to the environmental challenges of chemical disposal. This extension procedure spelled out in the treaty has been utilized by other countries, including the United States. The extended deadline for complete destruction (April 2012) was not met. As of October 2011, Russia had destroyed 57% of its stockpile. Russia also destroyed all of its declared Category 2 (10,616 MTs) and Category 3 chemicals.

Russia has stored its chemical weapons (or the required chemicals) which it declared within the CWC at 8 locations: in Gorny (Saratov Oblast) (2.9% of the declared stockpile by mass) and Kambarka (Udmurt Republic) (15.9%) stockpiles already have been destroyed. In Shchuchye (Kurgan Oblast) (13.6%), Maradykovsky (Kirov Oblast) (17.4%) and Leonidovka (Penza Oblast) (17.2%) destruction takes place, while installations are under construction in Pochep (Bryansk Oblast) (18.8%) and Kizner (Udmurt Republic) (14.2%).

On September 27, 2017, OPCW announced that Russia had destroyed its entire declared chemical weapons stockpile. Ukraine claims Russia used chemical weapons in Mariupol.

Novichok agents

A range of Novichok agents were developed and tested in the 1970s and 1980s, but the intended Novichok weapons production site at the Pavlodar Chemical Plant in Soviet Kazakhstan was still under construction when it was decided to demolish the chemical weapons building in 1987 in view of the forthcoming Chemical Weapons Convention.

In March 2018, former GRU agent Sergei Skripal and his daughter were poisoned in Salisbury, United Kingdom by a chemical agent later confirmed to be Novichok. The incident raised new controversy over Russia's potential production and use of chemical weapons, with the United Kingdom accusing the Russian government or rogue Russian agents of orchestrating the attack, a claim Russia repeatedly denied.

In August 2020, Russian opposition figure and anti-corruption activist Alexei Navalny was poisoned in Tomsk, Russia by a chemical agent later confirmed to be Novichok. A joint investigation by Bellingcat, CNN, Der Spiegel, and The Insider with contributions from El País implicates Russia's Federal Security Service (FSB) in the near-fatal nerve-agent poisoning, a fact denied by Russia. Navalny later called what appears to be one of the FSB agents responsible for the cleanup operation who indicates they were tasked to clean Navalny's underpants of Novichok.

Disposal facilities
The last Russian chemical disposal facility in Kizner, Udmurtia, was opened in December 2013.

See also

 2022 Russian invasion of Ukraine
 Defense industry of Russia
 Father of All Bombs
 List of Russian weaponry makers
 Military doctrine of Russia
 New physical principles weapons
 Nuclear weapons and the United States
 Nuclear weapons of the United Kingdom
 Nunn–Lugar Cooperative Threat Reduction
 Soviet biological weapons program
 United States and weapons of mass destruction

References

Further reading
 Kostenko, Y., & D’Anieri, P. (2021). Ukraine’s Nuclear Disarmament: A History (S. Krasynska, L. Wolanskyj, & O. Jennings, Trans.). Cambridge: Harvard Ukrainian Research Institute.

External links
Video archive of the Soviet Union's Nuclear Testing at sonicbomb.com
Abolishing Weapons of Mass Destruction: Addressing Cold War and Other Wartime Legacies in the Twenty-First Century by Mikhail S. Gorbachev
Russia's Nuclear Policy in the 21st Century Environment - analysis by Dmitri Trenin, IFRI Proliferation Papers n°13, 2005
Nuclear Threat Initiative on Russia by National Journal
Nuclear stockpile estimate fas.org
Nuclear Notebook: Russian nuclear forces, 2006, Bulletin of the Atomic Scientists, March/April 2006.
Current information on nuclear stockpiles in Russia. nuclearfiles.org
Chemical Weapons in Russia: History, Ecology, Politics by Lev Fedorov, Moscow, Center of Ecological Policy of Russia, 27 July 1994
History of the Russian Nuclear Weapons Program fas.org
The Arsenals of Nuclear Weapons Powers nrdc.org
Nuclear pursuits, 2012

 
Weapons of Russia
Weapons of mass destruction by country
 
Nuclear weapons program of the Soviet Union
Soviet chemical weapons program
Soviet biological weapons program